Pointe-Claire station is a commuter rail station operated by Exo in Pointe-Claire, Quebec, Canada. It is served by the Vaudreuil–Hudson line.

 on weekdays, all 11 inbound trains and 12 outbound trains on the line call at this station. On weekends, all trains (four on Saturday and three on Sunday in each direction) call here. 

The station is located north of Autoroute 20 at the corner of Donegani and Ashgrove avenues. The station's two side platforms are connected by a pedestrian tunnel, with headhouses on either platform, in a parking lot located between the highway and the tracks, and on the south side of the highway. 

This station was opened as Lakeside in 1902; the name Pointe-Claire originally belonged to a different station, located west of here beyond Cedar Park station. Both stations were closed in 1980, but when a park and ride station was found to be needed, the Lakeside site was chosen, and the station rebuilt and reopened in 1986. Days after its reopening it was renamed Pointe-Claire.

Bus connections

Société de transport de Montréal

References

External links
 Pointe-Claire Commuter Train Station Information (RTM)
 Pointe-Claire Commuter Train Station Schedule (RTM)
 2016 STM System Map

Exo commuter rail stations
Transport in Pointe-Claire
Railway stations in Montreal
Buildings and structures in Pointe-Claire